The Mnarani ruins are the remains of two mosques near Mnarani in Kilifi County, Kenya. Dating from the 15th century, the mosques are located on a bluff overlooking Kilifi Creek from the southern side. The settlement at the site dates back to the 14th century, and the site also contains a number of tombs.

References

Kilifi County
15th-century mosques
Mosques in Kenya
Swahili architecture
Monuments and memorials in Kenya